Congregation Albert is a Reform synagogue, located at 3800 Louisiana Boulevard NE in Albuquerque, New Mexico. It was established in 1897. The synagogue is the oldest Jewish organization of continued existence in the state.

History

Formation and early years
Congregation Albert was established as a synagogue in 1897.  It was established by Alfred Grunsfeld (its first treasurer), Henry N. Jaffa (its first president; he was also the first Mayor of Albuquerque), and Berthold Spitz (he was also the city's Postmaster for 12 years), after discussions with 70 members of the first congregation in Albuquerque, the B’nai Brith Lodge No. 336, which had been formed in 1883.

The naming rights of the new synagogue were auctioned off. In 1897, the Grunsfeld family, winning the auction for $250 ($ in current dollar terms), elected to name the synagogue after Alfred’s deceased father, Albert Grunsfeld, who had immigrated to Santa Fe, New Mexico, from Germany in the 1870s.

At the outset, the synagogue had 34 members and its religious services were held at the Knights of Pythias Hall on Gold Avenue in downtown Albuquerque.  Half a year later, the synagogue moved to the Jolly Ten Hall located on Gold Avenue.

Congregation Albert advertised for a rabbi in The American Israelite. Its first Rabbi was Dr. William H. Greenburg of London, England, who served from 1898 to 1900 and held his first service for 50 members on March 18, 1898.  Greenburg served in his initial two-year term for a salary of $125 per month ($ in current dollar terms).

After its cornerstone was set on September 3, 1899, in April 1900 Congregation Albert's first building was dedicated on West Gold Avenue (at the northeast corner of its intersection with 7th Street), with an onion-shaped oriental dome, pitched roof, and twin staircases leading to a second-story entrance, and Rabbi Pizer Jacobs was installed as the second rabbi of the synagogue. In 1902, Jacob H. Kaplan became the Rabbi. Methodists were allowed to use the synagogue until their church was built in 1904.  In 1919, the synagogue had 84 members and, after a dip during the Depression, in 1944 it had 87 members.

Rabbi David D. Shor served the congregation from 1948 to 1978, during which time he was tendered a lifetime contract in 1956.  In 1951, Congregation Albert moved to a building on Lead, between Oak and Mulberry SE.

Recent history
At the time of the synagogue's 75th anniversary, a 600-copy limited edition Diamond Jubilee History entitled Congregation Albert, 1897–1972 by Professor Gunther Rothenberg, a University of New Mexico professor of  European history and Jewish history, was printed.  In 1975, the synagogue elected a woman president, Ethel Cahn.

The synagogue was led by Rabbi Paul J. Citrin from 1978 to 1996.  In 1984, Congregation Albert moved to its current location, at 3800 Louisiana Boulevard NE, just south of Montgomery.

The synagogue was led by Rabbi Joseph R. Black from 1996 to 2010.  In 2000, out of 606 working members, 14% were doctors and 9% were attorneys.  In 2005, it had more than 700 members. Alex Bregman, a baseball player who was selected with the second pick in the first round of the 2015 Major League Baseball Draft, was a member of Congregation Albert growing up.

Celia Surget has served as Congregation Albert's Rabbi since July 1, 2021, and Barbara Finn serves as Cantor. The synagogue is a member of the Union for Reform Judaism, having joined in 1921.

References

External links
Synagogue home page

Synagogues in New Mexico
Congregation Albert
Reform synagogues in New Mexico
Congregation Albert
Congregation Albert
Synagogues completed in 1984
Congregation Albert